Drift is a 2023 drama film directed by Anthony Chen from a screenplay by Susanne Farrell and Alexander Maksik. It is based on the novel A Marker To Measure Drift by Maksik.  A French, British and Greek co-production, it is Chen's first English-language feature. The film stars Cynthia Erivo, Alia Shawkat, Ibrahima Ba, Honor Swinton Byrne, Zainab Jah and Suzy Bemba.

Drift had its world premiere at the Sundance Film Festival on 22 January 2023.

Plot summary
The film follows Jacqueline, a Liberian refugee, who flees to a Greek island and develops a friendship with an American tour guide while coping with her past.

Cast

Production
The film is a co-production between France's Paradise City Films, Greece's Heretic and the United Kingdom's Fortyninesixty, in association with Cor Cordium, Edith's Daughter and Giraffe Pictures, and is financed by Sunac Culture and Aim Media, Lauran Bromley's Ages LLC, the UK Global Screen Fund, and the Greek Film Center, with additional support from the Creative Europe Media European Program. United Talent Agency handles North American rights on the film.

Production concluded in May 2022.

Release
The film had its world premiere at the 2023 Sundance Film Festival in the Premieres section on 22 January 2023.

Reception 
On review aggregator website Rotten Tomatoes, the film has an approval rating of 56% based on 18 reviews, with an average rating of 5/10.

References

External links
 

2023 films
Films based on American novels
Films set in Greece
Films shot in Greece
2020s English-language films
2020s Greek-language films
2020s French films
2020s British films
2023 drama films
2023 independent films